Tulane University Law School is the law school of Tulane University. It is located on Tulane's Uptown campus in New Orleans, Louisiana. Established in 1847, it is the 12th oldest law school in the United States.

In addition to the usual common law and federal subjects, Tulane offers electives in the civil law, giving students the opportunity to pursue comparative education of the world's two major legal systems (Louisiana is the only state to have a civil law system, rather than common law). Students are permitted to survey a broad range of subject areas or to concentrate in one or more.

Tulane Law School's environmental law and sports law programs are considered among the strongest nationwide, and its maritime law program is among the most well-regarded in the world. For more than 20 years, the school has hosted the Tulane Corporate Law Institute, a preeminent mergers and acquisitions (M&A) and corporate law forum.

Campus 

The law school's  building, John Giffen Weinmann Hall, was completed in 1995. Designed to integrate classrooms, a student lounge, a computer lab, faculty offices, and a law library that contains both national and international collections, the building is centrally located on Tulane's Uptown campus.  The law school has been on the Uptown campus since 1906, and has been housed in several buildings since then, until the completion of Weinmann Hall.  The law school was located in Jones Hall from 1969 until 1995, where scenes for The Pelican Brief were filmed.

Next to Weinmann Hall on the 6200 block of Freret Street is the Law Annex, a light gray cobblestone building that houses the Center for Energy Law and the Center for Environmental Law. The Law Annex was a faculty residence before being converted for its current use. Nearby is the Howard-Tilton Memorial Library, Tulane's main library; the Lavin-Bernick Center, which houses university dining facilities and the university bookstore; the Reily Student Recreation Center (a gym with indoor and outdoor swimming pools, and basketball, squash, and tennis courts); the Freeman School of Business; the Newcomb Art Gallery; and various other buildings.

The Uptown campus is marked by many large live oak trees and historically significant buildings. Architectural styles include Richardsonian Romanesque, Elizabethan, Renaissance, Brutalist, and Modern architecture. The front-of-campus buildings use white Indiana Limestone or orange brick for exteriors, while the middle-of-campus buildings are mostly adorned in red St. Joe brick.  In all, Tulane's Uptown campus occupies more than 110 acres (0.4 km²), facing St. Charles Avenue directly opposite Audubon Park, which features the Audubon Zoo, and a  pedestrian trail around a public golf course. The campus is also a short bicycle ride from the Mississippi River and a 25+ mile bicycling/jogging trail that runs along it.  The St. Charles Avenue Streetcar Line makes the campus accessible via public transit. Loyola University is directly adjacent to Tulane, on the downriver side.

Academic program

To complete the Juris Doctor (J.D.) degree program, a student must finish six semesters in residence, 88 credit hours, an upper-level writing requirement, and a 50-hour community-service obligation. The first-year curriculum comprises eight required courses. The first-year legal-research-and-writing program is taught by instructors with significant experience as lawyers and writers, each assisted by senior fellows.

After the first year, all courses are electives, except for a required legal-profession course. All first-year and many upper-class courses are taught in multiple sections to allow for smaller classes. The upper-class curriculum includes introductory as well as advanced courses in a broad range of subject areas, including international and comparative law, business law, corporate law, environmental law, maritime law, criminal law, intellectual property, taxation, litigation, and civil procedure, among others.

Tulane Law offers six optional concentration programs for J.D. students who wish to receive one certificate of completion in an area. The six are European legal studies, environmental law, international and comparative law, maritime law, sports law, or civil law.

Tulane's Eason Weinmann Center for Comparative Law, its Maritime Law Center, and its Institute on Water Policy & Law, promote scholarship in comparative, maritime, and environmental law.

Tulane conducts an annual summer school in New Orleans and offers summer-study programs abroad. Tulane also offers semester-long exchange programs with select law schools in a number of countries throughout the world.

In addition to the J.D., the school offers two graduate degrees in law: The Master of Laws (LL.M.) the Doctor of Laws (S.J.D.) program. The five specialized LL.M. programs are in: maritime law, energy and environmental law, American business law, American law, and international and comparative law.  LL.M. students may also pursue a general LL.M., which does not concentrate in any one area.

The law school offers six live-client clinical programs, in the areas of: civil litigation, criminal defense, juvenile litigation, legislative and administrative advocacy, domestic violence, and environmental law (the Tulane Environmental Law Clinic). In addition, there is a trial-advocacy program, and third-year students may engage in externships with federal and state judges, with a local death-penalty project, or with certain administrative agencies.  The judicial externships are possible because of Tulane's close proximity to the U.S. Fifth Circuit Court of Appeals, the U.S. District Court for the Eastern District of Louisiana, and the Louisiana Supreme Court, all of which are in New Orleans. The school was the first in the country to institute a pro bono program requiring that each student complete legally related community service prior to graduation.

Every summer, BarBri, a national bar exam-preparation company, offers New York Bar Exam and Louisiana Bar Exam preparation courses at the Tulane Law School. Additionally, a California Bar Exam preparation course is offered when demand warrants it, as it did in 2010.

Study abroad programs 
Tulane Law School was one of the first five schools in the United States to offer a foreign summer law program. As of 2008, over 4,000 law students from approximately 140 U.S. law schools attended Tulane Law's summer abroad programs, taught by faculty from Tulane, other U.S. law schools, and universities abroad. Through the years, prominent scholars and federal judges have highlighted Tulane's summer faculty, including Supreme Court justices Harry Blackmun, Stephen Breyer, Ruth Bader Ginsburg, Antonin Scalia, and William Rehnquist. In the past, the law school's summer programs have taken place in Amsterdam in the Netherlands; Berlin in Germany; Cambridge and London in England; Paris and Grenoble in France; Rhodes and Spetses in Greece; and Siena in Italy.

JD/MBA program
Tulane benefits from having a top law school and a top business school located immediately next to one another, both of which consistently rank among the top 50 in the nation, according to the U.S. News & World Report and the Financial Times (the Finance department in particular has been ranked among the top 10 in the world on several occasions).  This close proximity has facilitated the growth of Tulane's JD/MBA program.  In the '06–'07 school year, Tulane boasted of having 25 joint JD/MBA candidates. In March 2007, Tulane announced that it had hired a new business law professor, whose objectives would include "maximiz[ing]...the growth of the Law School's JD/MBA joint degree," and strengthening ties between the law school and Freeman School of Business. In January 2008, the Tulane JD/MBA Club held a networking event in New York City with the creator of jdmba.com, an interschool JD/MBA networking website.

Recent JD/MBA graduates have gone on to work for law firms, management consulting firms, investment banks, and in-house legal departments in New York, Houston, New Orleans, Los Angeles, and other cities. The program does not require highly qualified applicants to have significant full-time work experience.

In March 2009, the University announced the designation of a $1.5 million donation to support in perpetuity a JD/MBA professor of national stature at Tulane.

JD/MHA program
The joint Juris Doctor/Master of Health Administration program with the Tulane School of Public Health and Tropical Medicine (TUSPH&TM) permits students to earn both degrees in 4 years, whereas normally the JD would take 3 years and the MHA, 2 years. Students take 79 units in the law school (rather than the normally-required 88 units) and 46 units in TUSPH&TM. Students are permitted to skip the course Social and Behavioral Aspects of Global Health which is normally required for the Public Health Core. Students take Health Care Law in the law school instead of the TUSPH&TM version of the course, and the course counts for both JD and MHA.

In recent years, the program has enrolled 0–2 students per year, and graduating students have gone into health care law practice and health care management in approximately equal numbers.

JD/MA in Latin American Studies
Enriched by Tulane's position of hosting one of the top Latin American Studies programs in the United States, the joint degree in law and Latin American Studies meets the need for "lawyer-statesmen" who know the law and who understand the societies of Latin America. The program employs a multi-disciplinary approach intended to enhance appreciation of the economic, social, political, and other forces in Latin America that influence the development of law and legal institutions. In addition to law school requirements, students pursuing the joint JD/MA in Latin American Studies must complete 24 semester hours of coursework in graduate courses approved by the Roger Thayer Stone Center for Latin American Studies. Demonstrated competence in either Spanish or Portuguese is required, and competence in both is encouraged.

Degrees in international development
The Payson Center for International Development, which became part of the Law School in 2008, confers Master of Science, Joint Juris Doctor and Master of Science, Master of Laws (LLM) in Development, and Doctoral degrees.

Employment statistics 
According to Tulane Law School's 2015 ABA-required disclosures, 60% of the Class of 2015 obtained full-time, long-term, bar passage-required employment nine months after graduation, excluding solo practitioners, and 4.9% of the class was seeking employment but not employed. According to Tulane Law School's official 2017 ABA-required disclosures, 63.3% of the Class of 2016 was employed in non-school-funded, full-time, long-term, bar passage required jobs nine months after graduation, and 6.5% of the class was seeking employment but not employed.

Career development services 
Tulane Law School's Career Development Office has five career counselors, newly recruited. The School also has an office coordinator.

Rankings 
In March 2018, Law.com ranked Tulane Law 36th among its list of The Top 50 Go-To Law Schools.  
Tulane Law is ranked 37th in Law School 100's 2018 ranking, which relies on a qualitative assessment. 
The U.S. News & World Report's rankings for 2015 placed Tulane Law at 46th. Its most recent ranking, released in 2022, puts Tulane Law School at 55th.
The Leiter law school ranking, conducted in 2010, put Tulane at 38th, based on student quality.
The Hylton law school rankings, conducted in 2006, put Tulane at 39th.

Bar passage 
Tulane University Law School graduates had the 2nd highest passing rate, after LSU, on the Louisiana State Bar Exam administered in July 2021, according to results released by the Louisiana Supreme Court Committee. In all, 84.3 percent of Tulane students passed the bar on their first attempt, compared to the state average of 78.4 percent.

Ethnic diversity 
In scoring that runs from .14 (least ethnically diverse) to .73 (most diverse), Tulane's diversity index, according to the latest U.S. News & World Report Law School Diversity Index, is .33, with Hispanic students the largest minority at 8% of the student body. By way of comparison, among the top ten of U.S. News & World Report's Best Law Schools, those nearest to Tulane in this category are Duke University, with a score of .42, and University of Virginia, at .37.

Costs
Tuition and fees for a full-time Tulane Law School student for the 2017–2018 academic year are $54,658 ($50,358 tuition and $4,300 in mandatory fees). The total cost of attendance (tuition, fees, books and living expenses) for the 2017–2018 academic year is estimated at $77,334.

Law School Transparency estimated total cost of attendance for three years at $284,440 in 2017, noting that for the 2015–16 academic year, 32.3% of students received scholarships of 50% or more of tuition and fees.

Student activities
Student organizations sponsor educational programs and social events throughout the academic year. The law school also periodically hosts social events with the Tulane University School of Medicine and the Freeman School of Business.

An active moot court program holds trial and appellate competitions within the school and fields teams for a variety of interschool competitions. The Law School has a chapter of the Order of the Coif. The Student Bar Association functions as the student government and recommends students for appointment to faculty committees. Over 40 student organizations are active at Tulane, including The Federalist Society, American Constitution Society, Maritime Law Society, Sports Law Society, Tulane Law Women, Black Law Students Association, La Alianza, Asian Pacific American Law Students Association, Environmental Law Society, and several legal fraternities. The Tulane Public Interest Law Foundation raises funds, matched by the Law School, to support as many as 30 students each summer in public interest fellowships with a variety of organizations.

Journals published or edited at Tulane Law School include:
Tulane Law Review
Tulane Environmental Law Journal
Tulane Maritime Law Journal
Tulane Journal of Law and Sexuality, the official law journal for the National LGBT Bar Association
Tulane European and Civil Law Forum (faculty run)
Tulane Journal of International and Comparative Law
Tulane Journal of Technology and Intellectual Property
Sports Lawyers Journal, edited by Tulane Law students, published and funded by the national Sports Lawyers Association
Civil Law Commentaries, a publication of the Eason-Weinman Center for Comparative Law

Notable professors

Current
Michael R. Fontham – author of Trial Technique and Evidence, an Evidence book used by law students and practicing attorneys
Loulan Pitre Jr. – New Orleans lawyer with specialty in environmental issues, Harvard Law School graduate; member of the Louisiana House of Representatives for Lafourche Parish, 2000–2008
Edward F. Sherman – served as the 20th dean, from 1996 to 2001; helped Vietnam write its code of civil procedure
Gabe Feldman –  legal analyst for NFL Network

Former
David Bonderman, a founder of TPG Capital, one of the largest private equity investment firms globally
Charles E. Dunbar, civil service reformer and Tulane Law School professor from 1916–1941
James B. Eustis, U.S. Senator from 1876–1879
Hoffman Franklin Fuller, professor-emeritus; authority on tax law
John R. Kramer, served as the 19th dean, from 1986 to 1996; counsel to U.S. Rep. Adam Clayton Powell Jr. (D- N.Y.)
Cecil Morgan, New York City executive of Standard Oil; served as dean from 1963–1968
Lawrence Ponoroff – former professor and dean (was 21st dean from 2001 to 2009); appointed by the Chief Justice to the Advisory Committee on Bankruptcy Rules to the United States
Ferdinand Stone – former professor of civil law
Jonathan Turley, second most-cited law professor in the United States
 U.S. Supreme Court Justices: Harry Blackmun, Stephen Breyer, Ruth Ginsburg, Antonin Scalia, and Chief Justice William Rehnquist during Tulane Law Summer Study abroad.
Manuel Rodríguez Ramos, writer, Dean Emeritus of University of Puerto Rico School of Law and Secretary of Justice of Puerto Rico.
 Tania Tetlow – former Felder-Fayard Professor of Law and Vice President of Tulane University, named first female—and first non-Jesuit—President of Loyola University of New Orleans

Notable alumni

Business
Richard Brennan Jr. (1931–2015), Law school graduate but entered family restaurant business; owned Commander's Palace and other establishments in New Orleans
Dean Lombardi, JD, President and General Manager of the Los Angeles Kings, specialized in labor law
Peter Schloss, JD-1985, CEO of Broadwebasia
Mike Tannenbaum, JD-1995, 47-year-old General Manager of the New York Jets, graduated with Tulane's Sports Law certificate

Government

Governors
Newton C. Blanchard, 1870, Governor of Louisiana (D)
Murphy J. Foster, 1871, Governor of Louisiana (D)
Alvin Olin King, Governor of Louisiana (D)
Huey Long, 1915, Governor of Louisiana (D)
Francis T. Nicholls, Governor of Louisiana (D)
Jared Y. Sanders Sr., 1893, Governor of Louisiana (D)
Oramel H. Simpson, 1893, Governor of Louisiana (D)
David C. Treen, 1950, Governor of Louisiana (R)
Bob Wise, 1975, Governor of West Virginia (D)

U.S. Senators
Edwin S. Broussard, 1901, U.S. Senator (D)
Robert F. Broussard, 1889, U.S. Senator (D)
Allen J. Ellender, 1913, U.S. Senator (D)
Randall Lee Gibson, U.S. Senator (D), whom Gibson Hall is named after
John H. Overton, 1897, U.S. Senator (D)
Luther Strange, 1979, U.S. Senator (R)
David Vitter, 1988, U.S. Senator (R)

U.S. Representatives

Hale Boggs, 1937, U.S. Representative, 1941–1943, 1946–1972 (D)
James "Jimmy" Domengeaux, 1931, U.S. Representative (D)
Bob Livingston, 1968, U.S. Representative, 1977–1999 (R)
Enos McClendon, Law, Judge of the Louisiana 26th Judicial District Court from 1960 to 1978
Lewis L. Morgan, 1899, U.S. Representative, 1912–1917 (D)
James H. Morrison, 1934, U.S. Representative, 1943–1967 (D)
John Rarick, 1949, U.S. Representative, 1967–1975 (D)
Cedric Richmond, JD-1998, U.S. Representative, 2011–2021 (D)
Jared Y. Sanders Jr., 1914, U.S. Representative, 1934–1937, 1941–1943 (D)

Mayors
Ravinder Bhalla, Mayor of Hoboken, New Jersey (2017–)
Paul Capdevielle, 1868, Mayor of New Orleans, 1900–1904
Robert Poydasheff, Mayor of Columbus, Georgia (2003–2007) (R)
Ralph T. Troy, Mayor of Monroe, Louisiana (1972–1976) (D)
T. Semmes Walmsley, 1912, Mayor of New Orleans, 1929–1936 (D)

Judges
Peter Beer, 1952, U.S. District Court for the Eastern District of Louisiana
Nannette Jolivette Brown, 1963, United States District Court, Eastern District of Louisiana
Patricia E. Campbell-Smith, 1992, United States Court of Federal Claims
Edith Brown Clement, JD-1972, U.S. 5th Circuit (R)
W. Eugene Davis, 1936, United States Court of Appeals for the Fifth Circuit
Jimmy Dimos, JD-1963, Judge of 4th Judicial District of Louisiana, 1999–2006, former member and Speaker of the Louisiana House of Representatives (D)
John Allen Dixon Jr. (LL.B., 1947), Chief Justice of the Louisiana Supreme Court
Dee D. Drell, 1947, United States District Court, Western District of Louisiana
John M. Duhé Jr., 1957, U.S. 5th Circuit (R)
Eldon E. Fallon, 1939, United States District Court, Eastern District of Louisiana
Martin Feldman, 1957, United States District Court, Eastern District of Louisiana
Rufus Edward Foster, LL.B.-1895, U.S. 5th Circuit; also served as 11th dean of the Tulane Law School
Madeline Hughes Haikala, 1964, United States District Court, Northern District of Alabama
Yvette Kane, 1953, United States District Court, Middle District of Pennsylvania
Angel Martín, 1953, former Associate Justice of the Puerto Rico Supreme Court
Tucker L. Melancon, 1946, United States District Court, Western District of Louisiana
Patricia Head Minaldi, 1959, United States District Court, Western District of Louisiana
Harold A. Moise, 1902, associate justice of the Louisiana Supreme Court, 1948–1958 
Andrew G. T. Moore II, Delaware Supreme Ct; wrote Unocal Corp. v. Mesa Petroleum Co. and Revlon v. MacAndrews; founded the Tulane Corporate Law Institute
Bill Pryor, JD-1987, U.S. 11th Circuit; former Attorney General of Alabama
L. Felipe Restrepo, 1959, United States Court of Appeals for the Third Circuit
Wynne Grey Rogers, Louisiana Supreme Court
Eleni M. Roumel, 2000, United States Court of Federal Claims
Percy Saint, 23rd District Court Judge (1920–1924) and Louisiana Attorney General (1924–1932) (D)
James D. Simon, 1918, Louisiana Supreme Court (D)
Sarah S. Vance, 1950, United States District Court, Eastern District of Louisiana
Jeffrey P. Victory, 1971, associate justice of the Louisiana Supreme Court
Elizabeth Weaver, 1965, Michigan Supreme Court
Jacques Loeb Wiener Jr., 1961, U.S. 5th Circuit
Edward Douglass White, 1868, Chief Justice of the United States
John Minor Wisdom, 1929, U.S. 5th Circuit (R)
Bridgett N. Whitmore, JD-1998, 193rd District Court, Dallas County, Texas
Stephen D. Wheelis, JD-1985,  United States Bankruptcy Court, Western District of Louisiana at Alexandria/Monroe

Other political figures
 Shaun Abreu, 2018, member-elect of the New York City Council
 Jansen Tosh Owen, 2019, member of the Mississippi House of Representatives
Thornton F. Bell, 1901, judge of the 1st Judicial District Court in Caddo Parish 1912–1919 and 1921–1938 (D)
James H. "Jim" Brown, 1966, former Secretary of State of Louisiana (D)
Buddy Caldwell, 1973, Attorney General of Louisiana (R)
Tom Capella, 1993, assessor of Jefferson Parish; former state representative and Jefferson Parish Council member; lawyer in his native New Orleans
Harvey Locke Carey, 1939, Attorney and politician (D)
Edward M. Carmouche, Master of Civil Law 1940, chairman of the Louisiana Democratic Party from 1966 to 1968; attorney in Lake Charles
Philip Ciaccio, state representative, New Orleans City Council member, state circuit judge from 1982 to 1998
Jacob G. Daniels, L '2010, U.S. Selective Service System Chief Data Officer and Deputy General Counsel
William Tharp Cunningham, Law, judge of the 11th Judicial District in Natchitoches and Red River parishes, member of the Louisiana House of Representatives from 1908 to 1912
Donald Ensenat, 1973, former Chief of Protocol of the United States
Albert Estopinal Jr., 1890, St. Bernard Parish politician (D)
Grey Ferris, Mississippi state senator (D)
Harvey Fields – state senator for Union and Morehouse parishes from 1916 to 1920, member of the Louisiana Public Service Commission from 1927 to 1936; former law partner and political ally of Huey Pierce Long Jr. (D)
George M. Foote, 1947, city judge in Alexandria, 1955 to 1985
Jim Garrison, 1949, New Orleans District Attorney (D), played by Kevin Costner in the Oliver Stone film JFK
Alexi Giannoulias, 2003, former Illinois State Treasurer (D)
Philip H. Gilbert, district attorney, state district court judge, state senator, lieutenant governor from Assumption Parish (D)
Howard B. Gist Jr., former city attorney in Alexandria, Louisiana (D)
John Grenier, 1953, Birmingham lawyer and Alabama Republican Party figure (R)
William Pike Hall Sr., attended c. 1920, Louisiana state senator for Caddo and DeSoto parishes,  1924 to 1932, Shreveport attorney (D)
Lloyd Hendrick, state senator for Caddo and Desoto parishes from 1940 to 1948
George W. Jack, 1898; Judge of the United States District Court for the Western District of Louisiana from 1917 to 1924, based in Shreveport (D)
Whitfield Jack, attended 1930; Shreveport lawyer and officer of the United States Army in World War II and United States Army Reserve, 1946–1966 (D)
Stephen Douglas Johnson, J.D., 1988; chief counsel, U.S. House of Representatives Subcommittee, Financial Institutions and Consumer Credit, 1995–1997; Bush White House Senior Advisor, office of Federal Housing Oversight, 2001–2003; Washington, D.C. whistle blower
 Doug Johnstone, J.D., 1966; Justice, Alabama Supreme Court
 Bolivar Edwards Kemp Jr., 1897, Louisiana state attorney general 1948 to 1952
Samuel Lawrason, LL.D., 1874, state senator from St. Francisville who authored Lawrason Act of 1898 (D)
Sam A. LeBlanc III, J.D. 1963; state legislator, temporary federal appeals court judge; lawyer in New Orleans; retired to St. Francisville (D)
Samuel A. LeBlanc I, Law 1908; state legislator, state district and appeals court judge, justice of the Louisiana Supreme Court, 1949–1954 (D)
Walt Leger III, Law 2003; state legislator, 2008–2020; Speaker Pro Tempore, Louisiana House of Representstives, 2012–2020, New Orleans, Louisiana
F. A. Little Jr., J.D., 1961; retired judge of the United States District Court for the Western District of Louisiana (R)
Enos McClendon, LL.B.; judge of the Minden-based Louisiana 26th Judicial District Court from 1960 to 1978
Kenneth McClintock, J.D., 1980, 13th President of the Puerto Rico Senate, current Secretary of State and Lieutenant Governor of Puerto Rico
Philip H. Mecom, J.D. former United States Attorney for the district of western Louisiana 
Jean-Paul Morrell, 2004, New Orleans lawyer and Democratic member of both houses of the Louisiana State Legislature
Walter Nixon, 1951, impeached federal judge, subject of Nixon v. United States
Terry O'Neill, president of the National Organization for Women (NOW)
William Wiley Norris, III (1936–2016), city, district, and circuit court judge from West Monroe
George T. Oubre, member of the Louisiana State Senate from St. James Parish, 1968 to 1972; lost runoff election to William J. Guste in 1971 for state attorney general
John H. Overton, 1897, U.S. Senator
Charles B. Peatross, 1964, judge of the Louisiana Second Circuit Court of Appeal in Shreveport (D)
Keith M. Pyburn, 1936, member of the Louisiana House of Representatives for Caddo Parish from 1948 to 1952; attorney in Shreveport and Washington, D.C. (D)
George W. Reese Jr., Louisiana Republican political figure (R)
Todd Schuler, Maryland State Delegate (D)
Jasper K. Smith, Louisiana state representative from Caddo Parish 1944–1948 and 1952–1964, former city attorney of Vivian; dropped out of Tulane after passing the bar exam before he completed his studies (D)
Jefferson B. Snyder, district attorney in Madison Parish (D)
E. L. Stewart, 1897, lawyer and Minden and state representative for Webster Parish 1904 to 1908
James Sutterfield, 1981, New Orleans attorney and state legislator, 1970–1972 (R)
Roy R. Theriot, 1939, Louisiana Comptroller, 1960–1973 (D)
Jeff R. Thompson, 1995, member of the Louisiana House from Bossier Parish and incoming 9th Judicial District Court judge (R)
Frank Voelker Jr., chairman of the former Louisiana State Sovereignty Commission, lawyer in Lake Providence and later New Orleans (D)
Frank Voelker Sr., state district court judge based in Lake Providence, 1936–1963 (D)
Arthur C. Watson, 1933, State representative from Natchitoches Parish; chairman of Louisiana Democratic Party from 1968 to 1976 (D)
Clint Williamson, 1986, US Ambassador, White House policy official, United Nations envoy, and international war crimes prosecutor

Academia
Winston Chang, 1992–1996 former President – Soochow University (Taiwan); former chairman – Soochow University College of Law.

Arts
Jan Crull Jr., J.D., 1990, filmmaker, Native American Rights Advocate, attorney, and investment banker
Whitney Gaskell née Kelly, 1997, novelist
Robert Harling, movie screenwriter, producer and director.
Jonathan Hensleigh, JD-1985, writer of Die Hard with a Vengeance (1995), Jumanji (1995), and Armageddon (1998)

Popular culture references
In the sitcom Frank's Place, Bubba Weisberger (played by Robert Harper) is a Tulane Law School graduate.
CBS 60 Minutes II features TELC's work in the episode "Justice for Sale?" (March 24, 2000)
PBS Frontline features TELC's work in the episode, "Justice for Sale" (November 23, 1999)
NOW on PBS features TELC's work in the episode, "Formula for Disaster" (July 15, 2005).

See also
 H. Sophie Newcomb Memorial College

References

External links

 

 
Law schools in Louisiana
Law
Educational institutions established in 1847
1847 establishments in Louisiana

de:Tulane University
es:Tulane University